Buddy Cops, also known as Holy Beast Cops, is a 2016 Hong Kong-Chinese action crime comedy film directed by Peter Chik and starring Bosco Wong, King Kong Li, Kate Tsui and Charmaine Fong. Filming officially began on 2 April 2012 and wrapped up on 25 May 2012. The film was released on 21 April 2016 in Hong Kong and in China by Huace Pictures (Tianjing) on 22 April 2016.

Synopsis
After the hot-tempered police detective Fei messes up yet another operation, he is transferred to a fictional department that houses all the useless staff the force couldn’t sack. There he finds a new enemy in the mild-mannered desk officer Johnny, who loathes Fei’s disregard for discipline. But when Fei’s father and Johnny’s mother coincidentally become an item, the new brothers must somehow learn to cohabit under the same roof and also work together to rescue Bessie from Mr. Hung.

Cast
 Bosco Wong as Chan Kin-Fei
 King Kong Li as Johnny Li
 Charmaine Fong as Bessie Lo
 Kate Tsui as Petite Princess
 Stanley Fung as Philip Chan, Fei's father
 Elaine Jin as Giu, Johnny's mother
 Eric Tsang as Man Sir
 Candice Yu as Madam Chu
 Gordon Lam as Hung Cheng-Ting
 Jordan Chan as Lau Jing
 Lo Hoi-pang as Lo Hoi
 Alice Chan as policewoman
 Angela Tong as Mary
 James Ng as nerd
 Kaki Leung as policewoman
 Joe Junior as Mr Awesome
 Lo Mang as Mr Cool
 William Chak as policeman
 MC Jin as drug squad guy
 Lisa Cheng as Wolf girl
 Skye Chan Sin-Yeung as policewoman
 Sammy Sum Chun-Hin as Lo Hoi's crew
 Yao Bin as credit card Chiu
 Candy Yuen Ka-Man as reporter
 Jason Chan Chi-San as restaurant manager
 Lily Ho Ngo-Yi as couple
 Matthew Ko Kwan-Yin as policeman
 Vincent Lam as Crime squad head
 Akina Hong as First lady
 Kylie Weng Jia-Ni as Inspector
 Angus Chan Kwok-Jing as Inspector
 Edmond Siu Ka-Ho as Inspector
 Kau Cheuk-Nang as Inspector
 Moses Cheng Wing-Him as Inspector
 Calvin Chan Wai-Hung as Inspector
 Clayton Li as policeman
 Kim Lee Wai-Kin as policeman
 Andy Lau Tin-Lung as policeman
 Law Ho-Ming as subordinate
 Window Tsang Hoi-Cheong as subordinate
 Alan Tam Kwan-Lun as subordinate
 Mark Ma Kun-Tung as subordinate
 Wong Fung-King as tea lady
 Kong Foo-Keungas gang mate
 Wong Wai-Tong as gang mate
 Ronald Law Kwan-Moon as Lo Hoi's crew
 Jack Hui Ka-Kit as Lo Hoi's crew
 Sammi Cheung Sau-Man as Candy
 Penny Chan Kwok-Fung as couple
 Yeung Sau-Wai as couple
 Bella Lam Wing-Tung as waitress
 Rocky Cheng Kin-Lok as security guard
 Alan Wan Ka-Wai as security guard
 Lee Fung as leaflet distributor
 Michael Choi Hong-Nin as priest
 Ricky Yi Fan-Wai]] as supervisor
 Bob Lam as Chau Sir
 Kyle Cui as suspect
 Iris Tse Ching-Ting as MC
 Hyman Chu Hei-Man as actress
 Bryan Sheh Kit-Wah as chubby boy
 Tsang Yuk-Kuen as boy's mum
 Poon Koon-Lam as boy's auntie
 Otto Wong Chi-On as security guard
 Eddie Pang Wai-On as security guard
 Jacky Lee Sin-Hang as policeman
 Eddy Law Tin-Chi as CID inspector
 Tai Yiu-Ming as Chicken Wah

Reception
The film grossed  in China.

References

External links
 
 Buddy Cops at Hong Kong Cinemagic
 

Hong Kong action comedy films
2016 action comedy films
2010s crime comedy films
2010s Cantonese-language films
Shaw Brothers Studio films
Films set in Hong Kong
Films shot in Hong Kong
Hong Kong crime comedy films
Hong Kong buddy films
Chinese action comedy films
2010s buddy cop films
2016 comedy films
2010s Hong Kong films